Zunes may refer to:

Zune, a digital media brand owned by Microsoft
Stephen Zunes (born 1956), an international relations scholar